The International Webmasters Association (IWA), a non-profit professional association for web professionals, provides training courses and certification.

IWA reportedly has 100 official chapters representing over 22,000 individual members in 106 countries. IWA's accomplishments include the publishing of the industry's first guidelines for ethical and professional standards, web certification and education programs, specialized employment resources, and technical assistance to individuals and businesses. IWA is the only Web professional association that acts inside W3C: IWA members participate to the activities of W3C WCAG Working Group, ATAG Working Group, XHTML Working Group and other Working and Interaction group like Multimodal, education and Outreach.

External links
International Webmasters Association. Official site.

Web development
Webmaster
Training organizations